PetCloud is an Australian company selling pet care services based in Brisbane. PetCloud, screens potential pet sitters for pet owners. PetCloud was named a finalist in the Lord Mayor's Business Awards for Digital Strategy. In 2017, founder Deb Morrison was selected as 2017 Finalist for Young Entrepreneur in Brisbane.

Services 
PetCloud was founded by Deborah Morrison. PetCloud has been providing pet care services including dog walking, house sitting, grooming, pet taxis, pet sitting. The company has been featured in national and local media including Business News Australia, Brisbane Times. In December, 2016, PetCloud was named a finalist in the Lord Mayor's Business Awards for Digital Strategy and a finalist for High Growth Start Up.

PetCloud is partnered with RSPCA across most States in Australia. 20% of PetCloud booking revenues goes back to supporting the rescue work of their RSPCA Partners.

Awards and recognition  
 11th Lord Mayor's Business Awards.
 ISPT award for Digital Strategy

References

External links
 

Pets in Australia
Retail companies established in 2011
Internet properties established in 2011
Online retailers of Australia
Pet stores